Yolanda Císcar Mateu (12 December 1951 – 26 April 2012), known professionally as Yolanda Ríos, was a Venezuelan–born Spanish actress best known for her appearances on the game show Un, dos, tres... responda otra vez and her theatrical performances.

Beginnings
Yolanda Ríos broke onto the artistic scene at 19, playing a small role in Javier Aguirre's film Pierna creciente, falda menguante (1970), and a year later she appeared in the premiere of Antonio Buero Vallejo's play .

From there she jumped to Televisión Española, where she participated in some episodes of the series  (1970) and Tres eran tres (1972).

Television
Ríos found popularity when Narciso Ibáñez Serrador chose her as one of the hostesses of the first stage of the game show Un, dos, tres... responda otra vez, where she remained from 1972 to 1973, and on the first program of 1976, in which she and her fellow secretaries chose new secretaries by giving them their glasses.

Its new director, entrusted the young Yolanda Ríos to lead the three-hour variety program with actor  from The Chiripitiflauticos.

In subsequent years she made other forays into television, although increasingly further apart. She appeared in episodes of the series  (1977),  (1977), Segunda enseñanza (1986),  (1997),  (1999), and El comisario (2000), as well as the plays  (1972) and Molière's The Imaginary Invalid (1979) on the show Estudio 1.

Film

Theater

Later career
After training as a set designer with Elena Kriukova, she worked in that role on Yo, Leonor (2006), performed by María Luisa Merlo. In her last years she focused on the production of shows such as Grease and Spamalot.

Personal life
She was married to actor and stage director Juan Calot (son of actress Encarna Paso), the father of her two children Alicia and Edgar.

On 26 April 2012, Yolanda Ríos died in Madrid at age 60.

References

External links
 

1951 births
2012 deaths
Actresses from Caracas
Set designers
Spanish game show hosts
Spanish stage actresses
Venezuelan emigrants to Spain
20th-century Spanish actresses